The Philippine Councilors League – or more simply the PCL – is a formal organization of all the municipal and city councilors in the Philippines.

Last February 27, 2020, the outgoing national board declared a failure of elections after the automated election system contracted by the organization to conduct the election of its national officers failed. Competing for the top position were councilors Danilo Dayanghirang from Davao City, who was handpicked by President Rodrigo Duterte, and Jesciel Richard Salceda from Polangui, Albay.

References

External links 
 

Philippine local government unit leagues